Michel Rolland (born December 24, 1947) is a Bordeaux-based oenologist, with hundreds of clients across 13 countries and influencing wine style around the world. "It is his consultancies outside France that have set him apart from all but a handful of his countrymen." It is frequently addressed that his signature style, which he helps wineries achieve, is fruit-heavy and oak-influenced, a preference shared by influential critic Robert Parker.

Rolland owns several properties in Bordeaux, including Château Bertineau Saint-Vincent in Lalande de Pomerol, Château Rolland-Maillet in Saint-Émilion, Château Fontenil in Fronsac, and Château La Grande Clotte in Lussac-Saint-Émilion as well as joint venture partnerships with Bonne Nouvelle in South Africa, Val de Flores in Argentina, Rolland Galarreta in Spain and Yacochuya (Salta) and Clos de los Siete in Argentina.

Early life

Born into a wine making family in Libourne, Rolland grew up on the family's estate Château Le Bon Pasteur in Pomerol. After high school, Rolland enrolled at Tour Blanche Viticultural and Oenology school in Bordeaux with his father's encouragement. Excelling in his studies, he was one of five student chosen by director Jean-Pierre Navarre to evaluate the program's quality against that of the prestigious Bordeaux Oenology Institute. Rolland later enrolled in the institute, where he met his wife and fellow oenologist, Dany Rolland, and graduated as part of the class of 1972.

At the institute, Michel Rolland studied under the tutelage of renowned oenologists Pierre Sudraud, Pascal Ribéreau-Gayon, Jean Ribéreau-Gayon, and Émile Peynaud. Rolland has said these men were a great influence upon him and considers them the "Fathers of Modern Oenology."

In 1973, Rolland and his wife bought into an oenology lab on the Right Bank of Bordeaux in the town of Libourne. They took over full control of the lab in 1976 and expanded it to include tasting rooms. By 2006 the Rolland's lab employed 8 full-time technicians, analyzing samples from nearly 800 wine estates in France each year. Rolland's two daughters, Stéphanie & Marie, also work at the lab.

Michel Rolland's first clients included the Bordeaux Châteaux Troplong Mondot, Angélus, and Beau-Séjour Bécot. An early setback was the loss of two Saint-Émilion first growths, Château Canon and Château La Gaffelière, due to conflict in style with the owners and Rolland. According to Rolland, the loss "calmed him down" and brought him out of an awkward stage in his early career. Twenty years later, the two chateaux returned to be part of the more than 100 wineries who employ Michel Rolland as their consultant.

In his book Noble Rot: A Bordeaux Wine Revolution, William Echikson writes that before Michel Rolland became consultant to Château Lascombes, it "produced about 500,000 bottles of mediocre wine, about half of which was sold not as Lascombes itself, but as the inferior Chevalier de Lascombes." Today, Echikson contends, that even the Chevalier (the second wine of the estate) is better than the old full-fledged Lascombes.

Media exposure

Rolland features prominently in the critical 2004 documentary Mondovino by Jonathan Nossiter as an agent of wine globalization. In Mondovino, Rolland is seen on several occasions advising his clients to microoxygenate their wines, including a scene at Château Le Gay in Bordeaux. Since the film, Rolland has said that he is "not a fan of microoxygenation. The film suggests I am. Some of my clients inquire about it. It can help in special conditions — if the tannins are fierce or hard, micro-oxygenation can make them softer and rounder. In certain countries with certain terroir, like Chile or Argentina, I may use it." James Suckling, formerly of Wine Spectator, notes in an article about Rolland that "He is not a proponent of micro-oxidation in wine-making as some suggest, and never has been".

Michel Rolland is also a wine making consultant for the Amphorae Winery in Israel (marketed as Makura in the United States) and has started signing his name to their premium Makura series. He visits Amphorae and their vineyards once a year and has his assistants throughout the year help implement his practices adopted by Amphorae's wine making team at the winery and in their vineyards.

Rolland is among the wine personalities satirised next to Robert Parker in the 2010 bande dessinée comic book, Robert Parker: Les Sept Pêchés capiteux.

Influence
From his consulting work and media presence, Michel Rolland has influenced many aspects of both the French and global wine industry. Among the prominent wine personalities that have been influenced by Rolland is the Rhone wine producer Jean-Luc Colombo.

Napa Valley vineyards under Rolland influence 
Rolland's first projects outside of Bordeaux were in California. He now consults for many highly regarded Napa Valley wineries. These include:

 St. Supery, Rutherford
 Dalla Valle Vineyards, Oakville
 Jericho Canyon Vineyard, Calistoga
 Harlan Estate, Oakville
 Staglin Family Vineyard, Rutherford
 Bryant Estate, Pritchard Hill

Bordeaux vineyards under Rolland influence 
Rolland holds decisive roles (such as owner, cellar master, oenologist, consultant) in a number of chateaux in Bordeaux. These include:
 Angélus, St-Emilion Grand Cru
 Armens, St-Emilion Grand Cru
 Ausone, St-Emilion Grand Cru
 Beauregard, Pomerol
 Bellefont-Belcier, St-Emilion Grand Cru
 Bellevue Mondotte, St-Emilion Grand Cru
 Bibian, Haut-Médoc
 Blason de l'Evangile, Pomerol
 le Bon Pasteur, Pomerol
 Bonalgue, Pomerol
 Branas Grand Poujeaux, Moulis
 Brillette, Moulis
 de Camensac, Haut-Médoc
 Cap de Faugères, Côtes de Castillon
 Cap Léon Veyrin, Listrac-Médoc
 Certan de May de Certan, Pomerol
 Chapelle d'Ausone, St-Emilion Grand Cru
 Clarke, Listrac-Médoc
 la Clémence, Pomerol
 Clément-Pichon, Haut-Médoc
 Clinet, Pomerol
 Clos des Jacobins, St-Emilion Grand Cru
 Clos du Clocher, Pomerol
 Clos l'Eglise, Pomerol
 Clos les Lunelles, Côtes de Castillon
 Clos Saint-Martin, St-Emilion Grand Cru
 la Commanderie de Mazeyres, Pomerol
 Corbin, St-Emilion Grand Cru
 Côte de Baleau, St-Emilion Grand Cru
 la Couspaude, St-Emilion Grand Cru
 le Crock, St-Estèphe
 Croix de Labrie, St-Emilion Grand Cru
 Destieux, St-Emilion Grand Cru
 Destieux, St-Emilion Grand Cru
 la Dominique, St-Emilion Grand Cru
 l'Evangile, Pomerol
 Faugères, St-Emilion Grand Cru
 Faugères Cuvée Péby, St-Emilion Grand Cru
 la Fleur de Boüard, Lalande de Pomerol
 la Fleur de Gay, Pomerol
 Fombrauge, St-Emilion Grand Cru
 Fontenil, Fronsac
 Franc-Mayne, St-Emilion Grand Cru
 la Garde, Pessac-Léognan
 le Gay, Pomerol
 Giscours, Margaux
 Grand Mayne, St-Emilion Grand Cru
 Grand Ormeau, Lalande de Pomerol
 Grand-Pontet, St-Emilion Grand Cru
 les Grandes Murailles, St-Emilion Grand Cru
 les Grands Chênes, Médoc
 la Gravière, Lalande de Pomerol
 Jean de Gué, Lalande de Pomerol
 Julien, Haut-Médoc
 Kirwan, Margaux
 Larmande, St-Emilion Grand Cru
 Larrivet-Haut-Brion, Pessac-Léognan
 Lascombes, Margaux
 Latour-Martillac, Pessac-Léognan 
 Léoville-Poyferré, St-Julien
 Loudenne, Médoc
 Magrez-Fombrauge, St-Emilion Grand Cru
 Malartic-Lagravière, Pessac-Léognan
 Malescot-Saint-Exupéry, Margaux
 Monbousquet, St-Emilion Grand Cru
 Pape Clément, Pessac-Léognan
 Pavie, St-Emilion Grand Cru
 Péby Faugères, St-Emilion Grand Cru
 Petit Village, Pomerol
 Peyfaures, Bordeaux Superior
 Phélan-Ségur, St-Estèphe
 le Plus de la Fleur de Boüard, Lalande de Pomerol
 Pontet-Canet, Pauillac
 Ripeau, St-Emilion Grand Cru
 Rochebelle, St-Emilion Grand Cru
 Rouget, Pomerol
 la Sérénité, Pessac-Léognan
 Smith Haut Lafitte, Pessac-Léognan
 la Tour-Carnet, Haut-Médoc
 Troplong-Mondot, St-Emilion Grand Cru
 la Tulipe de la Garde, Libourne
 de Valandraud, St-Emilion Grand Cru
 la Violette, Pomerol
 Virginie de Valandraud, St-Emilion Grand Cru

See also
Parkerization of wine

Sources

Echikson, William. Noble Rot: A Bordeaux Wine Revolution. NY: W.W.Norton, 2004.
Robinson, Jancis (Editor) The Oxford Companion to Wine. Oxford, England: Oxford University Press, second edition, 1999

Footnotes

1947 births
Living people
People from Libourne
French winemakers
Oenologists